Mauwaha  is a village development committee in Saptari District in the Sagarmatha Zone of south-eastern Nepal. At the time of the 2011 Nepal census it had a population of 5,079 people living in 884 individual households. Mouwaha VDC is home of Nepal's first vice president Parmanand jha. Village is densely populated by nearly 5000 peoples. Various castes such as Bramhins, mandal, yadav, sah, dom, mushaar etc. living in the village. Vdc shows all the features of a developed village as it has got road, electricity, water, mobile tower, schools, health post etc.

References

Populated places in Saptari District
VDCs in Saptari District